Lesotho competed at the 2022 Commonwealth Games in Birmingham, England from 28 July to 8 August 2022. This was Lesotho's 12th appearance at the Commonwealth Games.

Lesotho's team consisted of 21 athletes (15 men and six women) competing in four sports. Lerato Sechele and Tumelo Makae were the country's flagbearers during the opening ceremony, while Moroke Mokhotho was the closing ceremony flagbearer.

Competitors
The Lesotho team is scheduled to consist of 21 athletes.

The following is the list of number of competitors participating at the Games per sport/discipline.

Athletics

Men
Track and road events

Women
Track and road events

Field events

Boxing

Men

Cycling

Road
Men

Mountain Biking

Weightlifting

References

External links
Birmingham 2022 Commonwealth Games Official site

Nations at the 2022 Commonwealth Games
Lesotho at the Commonwealth Games
2022 in Lesotho sport